Baby Blood (titled The Evil Within in the United States) is a French horror film directed and co-written by Alain Robak, and starring Emmanuelle Escourrou and Jean-François Galotte. The film is about a pregnant woman named Yanka whose womb is invaded by a parasite. The organism transforms her fetus into a monster that desires human blood. Yanka heeds the demand of blood for the creature until it requests to be carried to the sea where it was originally spawned.

The film was shown at the Avoriaz Fantasy Film Festival and the Sarasota French Film Festival in 1990. At Avoriaz, it became the first film to win a Jury Award despite not being in competition. In 2008, a sequel to the film was released titled Lady Blood.

Plot 
A snake-like parasite crawls into the uterus of an abused woman and circus performer named Yanka. The parasite demands human blood from Yanka who is first reluctant, but then finds that the only relationship she has is with the parasite. Yanka commits murders to devour the victims' blood in order to nurture the parasite. The parasite tells her that it is a creature that will replace man as the dominant species on the planet in five million years, and must be released in the ocean. The creature is eventually released in the sea where it abandons Yanka.

Cast

Production
Baby Blood was directed by Alain Robak who found that the interest in films of the fantastique genre had increased in France, and desired to make a film in this style as he was a fan of b-movies. Despite a proposed low-budget film, Robak initially had trouble finding producers to back the film, but received help when he got associated with producer Ariel Zeitoun.

Baby Blood began shooting on 16 May 1989 in Paris, France. The film was shot in five weeks. To save money, the circus in the film was a real circus located in Nanterre. The film features cameos from Jean-Yves Lafesse, Alain Chabat and Jacques Audiard. Robak got them to be in the film by simply asking them. Chabat had not been in films previously. Audiard agreed as he was friends with the filmmaker who created Baxter (1989). The film also has a cameo of Baxter the dog from the previously mentioned film. In the English-dubbed version, Gary Oldman provides the voice of fetus monster.

Release
The film was shown at the Avoriaz International Fantasy Film Festival in January 1990 and the Sarasota French Film Festival in November 1990. At Avoriaz, the film was shown in competition but despite being presented out of competition, it was awarded a jury award, the first time this had happened in the festival's history.
Baby Blood was released in France on 24 January 1990. The film played for three weeks in Paris where it sold 6750 tickets in its first week. In total, it sold 10381 tickets in Paris. In 2008, a sequel to the film was released titled Lady Blood.

In France, the film was released on VHS by Fil à Film in 1992. A Region 1 DVD of Baby Blood was released by Anchor Bay on 10 October 2006.

Remake

See also

Reproduction and pregnancy in speculative fiction
Parasitism
Brain Damage
Inseminoid
Xtro
Devil's Due

Notes

References

External links 
 
 

1990 films
1990s French-language films
French horror films
1990 horror films
1990s monster movies
Body horror films
Rape and revenge films
French pregnancy films
Fictional parasites and parasitoids
Films about cannibalism
1990 direct-to-video films
1990s French films